The Lancair Sentry is an American amateur-built aircraft that was designed and produced by Lancair of Redmond, Oregon, introduced in 2002. The aircraft was supplied as a kit for amateur construction, although it was also intended as a production military trainer aircraft. First flown in September 2001, only two were ever completed.

The design was intended to compete with other similar two-seat civil designs, such as the Thunder Mustang and the Turbine Legend. Military sales prospects included the Mexican Navy, but no orders were forthcoming.

Design and development
The Sentry is a two-seat development of the four-seat Lancair IV, with the door-accessed cabin replaced by a canopy. It also has an enlarged vertical tail fin.

The aircraft features a cantilever low-wing, a two-seats-in-tandem enclosed cockpit under a rear-hinged bubble canopy, retractable tricycle landing gear and a single engine in tractor configuration.

The aircraft is made from composite materials, predominantly carbon fiber reinforced polymer. Its  span wing employs a McWilliams RXM5-217 root airfoil, tapering to a NACA 64-212 tip airfoil. The standard engine used is the  Walter M601D turboprop powerplant powering an American  three-bladed Hartzell Propeller or a Czech  Avia Propeller.

Specifications (Sentry)

References

External links
Photo of a Sentry

Lancair aircraft
2000s United States sport aircraft
2000s United States civil utility aircraft
Single-engined tractor aircraft
Low-wing aircraft
Homebuilt aircraft
Aircraft first flown in 2002